Walter Greene Church Sr. (June 30, 1927 – October 1, 2012) was a Democratic member of the North Carolina House of Representatives who represented the state's 86th district, including constituents in Burke County.  A banker from Valdese, North Carolina, Church served seven terms in the state House. In November 2008, Church was narrowly defeated by Republican Hugh Blackwell, denying him an eighth term. His son, Walter G. Church, Jr., won the May 4, 2010 Democratic primary to run to regain his father's former seat, but lost in the Fall to State Rep. Hugh A. Blackwell-R. He died in 2012.

Electoral history

2008

2006

2004

2002

2000

References

|-

Democratic Party members of the North Carolina House of Representatives
1927 births
2012 deaths
21st-century American politicians
People from Valdese, North Carolina